Talazoparib, sold under the brand name Talzenna, is an orally available poly ADP ribose polymerase (PARP) inhibitor developed by Pfizer for the treatment of advanced breast cancer with germline BRCA mutations. Talazoparib is similar to the first in class PARP inhibitor, olaparib. It was approved in October 2018, in the United States and June 2019, in the European Union for germline BRCA-mutated, HER2-negative locally advanced or metastatic breast cancer.

Side effects
The most serious side effects in studies were related to the blood forming system and included anaemia (low red blood cell count), neutropenia (low neutrophil blood cell count) and thrombocytopenia (low platelet count). Serious forms of these conditions (grade 3 to 4) occurred in 39%, 21% and 15% of patients, respectively. Other adverse effects such as headache, nausea, hair loss and fatigue were mostly mild.

Interactions 

Combination with drugs that inhibit P-glycoprotein or BCRP may increase talazoparib concentrations in the body.

Mechanism of action
Talazoparib acts as an inhibitor of poly ADP ribose polymerase (PARP) which aids in single strand DNA repair. Cells that have BRCA1/2 mutations are susceptible to the cytotoxic effects of PARP inhibitors because of an accumulation of DNA damage. Talazoparib is theorized to have a higher potency than olaparib due to the additional mechanism of action called PARP trapping. PARP trapping is the mechanism of action where the PARP molecule is trapped on the DNA, which interferes with the cells ability to replicate. Talazoparib is found to be ~100 fold more efficient in PARP trapping than olaparib. However, this increased potency may not translate directly to clinical effectiveness as many other factors must be considered.

Commercialization
Talazoparib was originally developed by BioMarin Pharmaceutical Inc. However, Medivation Inc. acquired all worldwide rights to talazoparib in August 2015, to expand their global oncology franchise. Medivation acquired talazoparib for $410 million with additional payments of up to $160 million in royalties and milestones.  Under this agreement, Medivation assumed all financial responsibilities for the continued development, regulatory, and commercialization of talazoparib.

References

External links 
 
 

Fluoroarenes
PARP inhibitors
Triazoles